Athanasios "Nasos" Galakteros (born March 10, 1969, in Kavala, Greece) is a retired Greek professional titleholder basketball player. Galakteros played professionally in the Greek Basket League, and played in international tournaments.

Professional career
Galakteros started his basketball playing career with Amyntas, and he later he played with AEK. He was a Greek Cup finalist in 1992. In 1993, he moved to PAOK. While playing with PAOK, they won the FIBA Korać Cup in 1994, and the Greek Cup in 1995.

In the next season, Galakteros played with Olympiacos. With Olympiacos, they won 2 Greek League championships (1996, 1997), 1 Greek Cup (1997), and the EuroLeague (1997). The best season of his career was the 1996–97 season, when he won the Triple Crown. In 1998, Galakteros won the Greek Cup, while playing with Aris.

National team career
Galakteros was a member of the Greece men's national basketball team. He played at the 1990 FIBA World Championship, where Greece finished in 6th place, and at the 1994 FIBA World Championship, where Greece finished in 4th place. In total, he appeared in 74 games with Greece's senior national team, averaging 10.5 points per game.

Personal life
Galakteros has been married three times and has two children from his first and third marriages. 

From his first marriage with Teta Leontaridou, has a son Pavlos Galakteros (born 1997). 

From 2000 to 2007 Galakteros had been married with TV presenter Roula Koromila. 

In October 2008, Galakteros began dating journalist Nancy Zabetoglu. They married on August 18, 2012. In 2014, Zabetoglu gave birth to their daughter, Sophie Galakterou.

References

External links 
EuroLeague 1997 Stats
AEK.gr profile
Hellenic Federation Profile 

1969 births
Living people
AEK B.C. players
Amyntas B.C. players
Aris B.C. players
Greek Basket League players
Greek men's basketball players
1990 FIBA World Championship players
Olympiacos B.C. players
P.A.O.K. BC players
Power forwards (basketball)
Small forwards
1994 FIBA World Championship players
Basketball players from Kavala